"Dil Se Re" (translation: From the Heart) is a song from the movie Dil Se.., composed by A. R. Rahman, lyrics penned by Gulzar and sung by A. R. Rahman, Anuradha Sriram and Anupama in chorus. 

It was a chart topper of the year 1998 and this song's lyrics is said to be one of the finest and predominantly in Urdu. Guy Pratt, Pink Floyd bass guitarist for post Roger Waters albums Delicate Sound of Thunder, The Division Bell and Pulse played bass on this song.

Music video
The song takes place after Amar (Shahrukh Khan) tracks the evanescent Meghna (Manisha Koirala) down to her village and declares his intentions of asking for her hand in marriage. The music video combines different visual diagrams: the realist narrative, the steadycam shots, a transnational consumer lifestyle of advertising, tourism, pearl necklaces, designer gowns, and the constantly re-ordered body of the woman.

References

1998 songs
Indian songs
Hindi film songs
Songs with music by A. R. Rahman
Songs with lyrics by Gulzar